Gaetano Camillo Guindani also Gaetano Camillo Guindari (1834-1904) was an Italian prelate who was named bishop of Bergamo in the late years of the 19th century.

Life and career
Born in Cremona at the time part of Kingdom of Lombardy–Venetia, after his degree in theology at Pontifical Gregorian University he was ordained priest for his native diocese. He taught   dogmatic theology  at Cremona's seminary then from 1865 to 1872 he was rector of the seminary. In 1872 pope Pius IX named him bishop of Borgo San Donnino now Fidenza, in 1879 he was transferred by pope Leo XIII to the diocese of Bergamo.
He died in 1904 in Bergamo.

Notes 
In 1889 he confirmed the young Angelo Roncalli elected in 1958 pope John XXIII

References

External links and additional sources
 (for Chronology of Bishops) 
 (for Chronology of Bishops) 

1834 births
1904 deaths
Clergy from Cremona
Bishops of Bergamo
19th-century Italian Roman Catholic bishops
20th-century Italian Roman Catholic bishops